The Reform Party was a political party in the Northern Mariana Islands. It was not an affiliate of the Reform Party USA but rather the American Reform Party, a splinter group. The party was founded in 1999 by former Governor Froilan C. Tenorio, who claimed to be disgruntled and tired of the disunity showed by his former political affiliation, the Democrats. Despite this, in 2000, Gubernatorial and Democrat hopeful former Lt. Gov. Jesus C. Borja publicly expressed interest in a Democrat-Reform united front against the Republicans in the 2001 elections.

In the 2000 election, the Reform Party won their first and last seat in the Northern Mariana Island Senate with candidate Ramon "Kumoi" Santos Deleon Guerrero.

In the general elections held on 3 November 2001, the party won no seats and gubernatorial candidate Froilan Cruz Tenorio of the Reform Party won 1,368 votes out of the 12,124 votes (11.3%) coming in fourth place, defeated by the Republicans (42.8%), Covenant (24.4%), and Democrats (17.5%). In the 2003 elections, Senator Kumoi would lose his reelection bid, leaving the party with no elected offices. The Reform Party has not taken part in any of the following elections and is considered a dead party, abandoned after their 2003 defeat. Party founder Froilan Tenorio would switch back to the Democratic Party for his 2005 Gubernatorial bid. This signaled to all that the Reform Party was effectively dead. Their website no longer exists, only accessible through the Wayback Machine, which shows the last moment it was accessible is 2008 and that the last newsletter posted was by former Senator Ramon "Kumoi" Guerrero on 10 December 2001.

References

Political parties in the Northern Mariana Islands
Neoliberal parties